Bent Familia  is a 1997  drama set in Tunisia about Amina (Leila Nassim) a married Muslim woman living in Tunis with her two daughters. Even though she is allowed certain freedoms as a Muslim woman this is curtailed when she meets her old friend from school called Aida acted by (Amel Hédhili).

A mother of two, Aida took a firm stand not to tolerate her husband's infidelities. She divorced and considers herself a liberated woman. Then there is their mutual friend Fatiha (Nadia Kaci), an intellectual who is adamant that she is going to leave Tunis and settle in the West. This strong triangle of friendship threatens Amina's husband, Majid (Raoul Ben Amor), another adulterer who tries to bring the might of the chauvinist side of Muslim society down on her. Directed by Nouri Bouzid, this well-shot film presents us with the very real problems of women in contemporary North Africa, but offers no easy solutions.

Cast 
Raouf Ben Amor 
Kawther El Bardi 
Abderazek
Nadia Kaci
Kamel Touati

Awards 
1997: Montpellier Mediterranean Film Festival: Audience Award: Golden Antigone 
1997: Namur International Festival of French-speaking Film: Best Actress
1997: Venice Film Festival: OCIC Award Honourable Mention

Movie Trailer 
Bent-Familia  sourced from the Africa Film Library

External links 

 Bent Familia  on mnetcorporate.co.za

Bent Familia  on arabfilm.com
Bent Familia  on luxorafricanfilmfestival.com

1997 films
Tunisian drama films